The Chicago Maroons men's basketball team is an NCAA Division III college basketball team competing in the University Athletic Association. Home games are played at the Gerald Ratner Athletics Center, located on the University of Chicago's campus in Chicago.

The team's head coach is currently Mike McGrath.

Team history
The Maroons history in basketball dates to the 1893-94 season in which an organized team representing the university played a schedule of games primarily against YMCA opponents. They continued this type of schedule into the following season, both without a head coach. However, during the 1895-96 season the team added a head coach by the name of Horace Butterworth. Butterworth led the Maroons through two winning seasons and finish his tenure with 10 wins and only 4 losses before leaving Chicago to take on the role of athletic director and head baseball coach at Northwestern. The most notable event during the 1895-96 season for the Maroons was being a part of the first five-on-five college basketball game played in United States history. The game was played at Iowa City with the Maroons finishing victorious by a score of 15–12.

After the 1896-97 season, based on a lack of material and disinterest by participants, the University suspended its men's basketball program and promoted the women's program instead. Finally, in 1903 the program was reinstated and, with the Western Conference backing a conference champion, a varsity schedule was developed by athletic director Stagg. Wilfred Childs became the head coach of the Maroons for this newly developed team that finished the season with seven wins and zero losses, beating teams by an average score of 45–11. Childs would coach the Maroons through the 1905-06 season, turning the position over to Joseph Raycroft who would guide the team to four Big Ten Conference championships (then known as the Western Conference), and the 1907, 1908, and 1909 teams were all retroactively named national champions by the Helms Athletic Foundation; his 1909 team was also retroactively named the national champion by the Premo-Porretta Power Poll.

Championships

National Championships

University Athletic Association Championships

Big Ten Regular Season Championships

§ – Conference Co-champions

Individual honors

Naismith Memorial Basketball Hall of Fame
The following 4 Maroons have been inducted into the Basketball Hall of Fame:

Consensus All-American

Rhodes Scholars

Coaching history

Maroons home courts

Men's Gymnasium was located on the campus of the University of Chicago, a temporary structure built in 1891 and demolished in 1904.
Bartlett Gymnasium (1903–1932) is located on the campus of the University of Chicago, the building is named after Frank Dickinson Bartlett.  Bartlett's father, Adolphus Clay Bartlett, erected the gym as a memorial to his son who died of appendicitis in Munich, Bavaria, July 15, 1900, at the age of 20.
Henry Crown Field House (1933–2003) erected in 1932 as a single-story building. It originally served as an indoor practice facility with a dirt infield that was utilized for football and baseball practices. A track encircled the infield and a raised wood floor was used for basketball.  It is named after Chicago philanthropist Henry Crown.
Gerald Ratner Athletics Center (2003–present) opened on September 29, 2003 and continues to attract attention for its design and construction. The building was named after University of Chicago alumnus, Gerald Ratner.  It has earned numerous awards for its engineering and material usage. The architect of this suspension structure that is supported by masts, cables and counterweights was César Pelli, who is best known as the architect of the Petronas Towers.

References

https://web.archive.org/web/20131020015151/http://athletics.uchicago.edu/mensbasketball/mbk.htm
http://issuu.com/ucsid/docs/mbk-program-2011-12

External links
 

 
1893 establishments in Illinois
Basketball teams established in 1893